"The Princess of the Tide" (Russian: Морская царевна) is one of the last ballads by Mikhail Lermontov, written shortly before his death in 1841. In it, the poet expounds upon his classic theme, best captured in his masterpiece "Mtsyri," about the horrors of the loss of freedom and the value of paying its cost.

1841 poems
Poetry by Mikhail Lermontov